Marjut Heinonen (born October 28, 1976, in Trollhättan, Sweden) is a Finnish sport shooter. At age thirty-one, Heinonen made her official debut for the 2008 Summer Olympics in Beijing, where she competed in women's skeet shooting. She placed seventeenth in the qualifying rounds of the event, with a total score of 61 points.

Heinonen currently resides in Haapavesi, Finland, where she trains full-time at Haapaveden Ampumaseura, under her personal coach Rauli Honka.

References

External links
ISSF Profile
Profile – Suomen Olympiakomitea 
NBC 2008 Olympics profile

Finnish female sport shooters
Living people
Olympic shooters of Finland
Shooters at the 2008 Summer Olympics
People from Trollhättan
1976 births
European Games competitors for Finland
Shooters at the 2015 European Games
Shooters at the 2019 European Games